Rachael Meager is an Australian economist and statistician. She currently holds an Assistant Professorship at the London School of Economics, within the STICERD (Suntory and Toyota International Centres for Economics and Related Disciplines) research centre.

Meager has significantly contributed to the development of advanced statistical methods in economics. She has advanced the application of Bayesian Analysis for Randomized Controlled Trial data, for instance investigating robustness effects against treatment heterogeneity by considering the impact of leaving out small fractions of the data. She applies these techniques to development topics such as the impact of microcredit on economic growth and inequality.

Education 
Meager earned a Bachelor of Arts from the University of Melbourne as well as a Bachelor of Honours in Economics. She received her Ph.D. from  MIT Massachusetts Institute of Technology on evidence aggregation in Bayesian hierarchical modeling. Her principal adviser was Esther Duflo.

Grants and Awards 
 David Finch International Fellowship (MIT)
 AG Whitlam Honours in Economics Prize (University of Melbourne)
 BITSS SSMART Grant or Schultz Fund Grant (MIT)

References

Massachusetts Institute of Technology alumni
Alumni of the London School of Economics
Living people
Australian women economists
Australian statisticians
Women statisticians
Year of birth missing (living people)